El Barco de Ávila is a municipality located in the province of Ávila, Castile and León, Spain.  It forms part of the region of El Barco de Ávila - Piedrahíta and is located in the valley of Tormes river. Is the headboard of the natural region of Alto Tormes. In 2017 it has a population of 2436 population.

Place names and symbols
El Barco could take its name form a boat used to cross the river or, as different authors think, from different words of different languages: bar (in Hebrew house), from the Basque  or meeting between villages, form the Celtic house...

Location
El Barco de Ávila is located at the southwest of the province of Avila, near of the frontier of the provinces of Salamanca and Caceres, being the headboard of the region between the valley of the Tormes river and Aravalles river, better known as Alto Tormes. This municipality is located on an altitude of 1004 msnm. It has a surface of 12,68 km². It limits with La Carrera, El Losar del Barco, San Lorenzo del Tormes and Navatejares.

Climate
El Barco de Ávila has a warm climate with a dry and warm summer according to the climatic classification of Köppen.

Main sights
Castle (12th century, rebuilt in the 14th century)
Casa del Reloj
Romanesque bridge
Hermitage of Santísimo Cristo del Caño
Hermitage of San Pedro de El Barco
12th century walls

See also

 Judías de El Barco de Ávila Beans

References

Municipalities in the Province of Ávila